The 1905–06 season was the 35th season of competitive football in England.

Events

Following the increase in size of the Football League from 36 clubs to 40, and with Doncaster Rovers having been relegated from the Second Division, four new clubs were elected into the league, along with Stockport County who had won the Lancashire Combination. These new clubs were: Chelsea, Hull City, Leeds City and Clapton Orient. Crystal Palace were formed this year but failed to gain election to the Football League by one vote and instead started their existence in the Southern League.

Bristol City, the only non-London League side south of Birmingham at the time, is promoted to the First Division as champions.

March 1906 - Aston Villa signed outside right, Herbert Kingaby from Clapton Orient, for the then undisclosed fee of £300 (2012: £).

Honours

Notes = Number in parentheses is the times that club has won that honour. * indicates new record for competition

League tables

First Division

Second Division

References